Douglas Eric Anderson (29 August 1963 – 15 June 2015) was a footballer who played as a winger in the Football League.

Born in Hong Kong, he began his career as a youth with Port Glasgow Rangers, and then Oldham Athletic.

He moved to Tranmere Rovers in 1984. The most successful of his career, he scored 15 goals in 126 games for Tranmere.

Dave Smith brought him to Plymouth Argyle for £15,000 in August 1987. He only managed 22 appearances in the 1987–88 season. The following season, he was loaned to Cambridge United and Northampton Town before the UK to play for South China in his native Hong Kong.

He died suddenly from a heart attack in June 2015 at the age of 51.

References

External links
Doug Anderson's career

1963 births
2015 deaths
Hong Kong people
Association football midfielders
Oldham Athletic A.F.C. players
Tranmere Rovers F.C. players
Plymouth Argyle F.C. players
Northampton Town F.C. players
Cambridge United F.C. players
English Football League players
English footballers